Third Street Bethel A.M.E. Church is a historic African Methodist Episcopal church located in Richmond, Virginia.  It built in 1857, and remodeled in 1875. It is a large Victorian Gothic brick building with two-story towers flanking a central gable.  The central gable and towers feature Gothic lancet windows.

It was listed on the National Register of Historic Places in 1975, with an enlargement of the listing in 2019.

References

External links
Official Church Website

Churches on the National Register of Historic Places in Virginia
Gothic Revival church buildings in Virginia
Churches completed in 1857
African Methodist Episcopal churches in Virginia
Churches in Richmond, Virginia
National Register of Historic Places in Richmond, Virginia
1857 establishments in Virginia